Maniitsoq Island is an island in the Qeqqata municipality in western Greenland.

Geography 
The island is located on the shores of Davis Strait, separated from Sermersuut Island in the north by the Ammarqoq Sound. The island is roughly triangular in shape and many little islets and rocks dot its eastern and southwestern coastline. 

Located at the southern end of the island, Maniitsoq was formerly known as Sukkertoppen. It is the only settlement in the area and is served by the Maniitsoq Airport.

See also
List of islands of Greenland

References

External links

Air Greenland - Maniitsoq
Davis Strait
Islands of Greenland